Marquette University High School (MUHS) is a private, all-male, Jesuit, Roman Catholic school located in Milwaukee, Wisconsin.  It is accredited by the North Central Association Commission on Accreditation and School Improvement (NCA CASI), an accreditation division of Cognia, and is a member of both the National Catholic Educational Association and the Jesuit Schools Network.

History 
Founded as St. Aloysius Academy in 1857 on 2nd and Michigan St, the institution was renamed to St. Gall's Academy and moved location in 1864. The institution became Marquette College in 1881 when a new school was opened on 10th and State St, on the top of a hill. The hilltop location gave rise to the nickname and mascot: the Hilltoppers. 

In 1907 Marquette College became Marquette University and formally separated from Marquette Academy. In 1922 Marquette Academy became Marquette University High School, and the campus at its current location was completed in 1925.

Campus 
Marquette University High School is located at 3401 W. Wisconsin Avenue in the Merrill Park Neighborhood on Milwaukee's west side. It is a four-story building built in the early 20th century. In 1961, the gym and cafeteria addition was added. The Gordon Henke Center was completed in 1994 which included a new main entrance on W. Michigan St. In 2008, the attached Jesuit residence was demolished to make way for a 1 story administrative and fine arts addition. Another 2 stories was built on top in 2016 creating 3 stories adjacent to the original 1925 building. In addition to the new classrooms, an atrium and expansion to the Henke entrance was added.

The Hilltoppers' home field for soccer and track is Quad/Park, located a few blocks away adjacent to Merrill Park. It was donated by former MUHS graduate Harry Quadracci ('54), in 1998. The site was formerly occupied by Marquette Stadium, which opened in 1924 and was demolished in 1976.

Athletics 
Nicknamed the "Hilltoppers", MUHS teams compete in the Greater Metro Conference of the Wisconsin Interscholastic Athletic Association (WIAA) for most sports. Prior to 1999, MUHS competed in the now defunct Wisconsin Independent Schools Athletics Association (WISAA). The school fields teams in baseball, basketball, cross country running, downhill skiing, football, golf, ice hockey, lacrosse, rugby union, soccer, swimming, tennis, track and field, volleyball, and wrestling.

MUHS teams have won 28 WIAA state titles in soccer, volleyball, tennis, baseball, and football, as well as the lacrosse team's 2010 and 2013 WLF state championships. In the summers of 2008, 2009, 2010, and 2011 the Hilltoppers were ranked #1 in the state for overall boys' athletics by the Milwaukee Journal Sentinel. In the program's history, the Hilltoppers have won over 130 State Championships.

Basketball 
The basketball team was 84–29 in five seasons from 1997 to 2002. The team won the 1999 Greater Metro Conference and WISAA Division I State Boys Basketball Championships, when the Hilltoppers went 21–3 and defeated Dominican High School in the championship game. The basketball team also won Greater Metro conference championships in the 1997–98 and 1999–2000 seasons. In 2010, the Hilltopper basketball team made it to the WIAA Division I state semifinals, before losing to eventual champion Arrowhead. In 2016, The Hilltoppers made another run in the post season, eventually being defeated to Muskego in the WIAA Division I state semifinals.

Cross country 
The MUHS cross country team has won the Greater Metro Conference meet 8 of the last 9 years, and took third at both the 2007 and 2008 WIAA state meets, as well as second in 2009, 2010, and 2020.

Football 
Marquette has a football team that dates back to 1907, playing in over 1,000 games. Over that time, Marquette has won 701 games, 40 conference titles and 9 state titles. Their most successful coach, Dick Basham, coached Marquette for 38 seasons and 42% of its 1,000 games. In 2009 (his last season), the Hilltoppers went 14-0 to win their most recent WIAA Division 1 state title. The team currently has a partnership with ESPN Milwaukee Radio for all home and away games. Marquette football is the most historically successful high school football program in the state, with more than 140 more wins than the second place team.

Lacrosse 
The MUHS lacrosse team has competed in the state tournament five times since its creation in Spring 2003 and won its first state title in 2010, which completed an undefeated season in Wisconsin. The lacrosse team annually competes against other Jesuit schools from around the United States, traveling to Indianapolis every spring where Jesuit teams from across the Midwest compete. In 2013, the MUHS lacrosse team won its second state title, with another undefeated season in Wisconsin under long-time head coach Rich Pruszynski. Rich is Wisconsin's all-time most successful boys' lacrosse coach and the first WI high school coach to guide a team to 100 wins, which was also done in 2013.

Soccer 
Since 1973, the soccer program has won 24 state championships and tied a national record of 10 straight state championships from 1994 to 2003. The Hilltoppers were ranked #1 in the country by the National Soccer Coaches Association of America in 1999 and in 2003. The 2011 soccer team finished the season with an undefeated record of 24–0–1 and were ranked 4th in the US by the NSCAA and 3rd by ESPN. In 1996 and 2011 the soccer coach, Bob Spielmann and Steve Lawrence, respectively, were selected as National High School Coach of the Year.

In 2012, the Hilltoppers won the state championship, defeating Kettle Moraine High School, 2–1. In 2014, the Hilltoppers once again won a state title by beating Menomonee Falls 4–1. Throughout the 2010's, they won 8 out of 10 possible state championships. The two years they did not win came in 2013 and 2019. The loss in 2019 broke a streak of 5 straight state championships. The state title has gone on to be won in 2020 and 2021.

Co-Curriculars

FIRST Robotics 
FIRST Robotics Competition Team 1732 - Hilltopper Robotics was founded in 2006 under the leadership of John Wanninger, who was a recipient of the Woodie Flowers Award in 2008.  The team is co-ed, welcoming students from Divine Savior Holy Angels High School. A total of 7 regionals have been won by the team, with regional wins in 2022, 2017, 2014, 2013, and 2010. The Chairman's Award, the most prestigious award in FIRST was won 2 times, in 2012 and 2014.  The team qualified for the FIRST Championship 11 times, with championship division playoffs reached several times.

Science Olympiad 
Started in 2015, the Science Olympiad program won the state tournament in 2021 and 2022, and placed 1st in the region 4 times in 2018, 2019, 2020, and 2022. At the national tournament in 2022, the team ranked 4th nationwide.

Notable alumni and faculty 

 Tom Barrett, United States Ambassador to Luxembourg and former Mayor of Milwaukee
 Robert J. Beck, Associate Professor of Political Science at the University of Wisconsin–Milwaukee
 Gene Berce, NBA player
 Charlie Berens, comedian and host of "Manitowoc Minute" 
 Dick Bilda, former Green Bay Packer
 Peter Bock, former Wisconsin State Assembly
 Peter Bonerz, actor, director; The Bob Newhart Show (1972 - '76) and others
 James B. Brennan, Wisconsin State Senator and U.S. Attorney
 Terry Brennan, Notre Dame running back (1946–1949) and coach (1954–1958)
 Jeff Bridich, baseball player and executive
 John C. Brophy, a former member of the House of Representatives
 James L. Callan, Wisconsin State Senator
 David A. Clarke Jr, Sheriff of Milwaukee County, Wisconsin
 Paul Choi, Harvard Law Review, President Harvard Alumni Association & Board of Overseers, Partner at Sidley
 John T. Chisholm, District Attorney of Milwaukee County, Wisconsin
 John Louis Coffey, judge
 Robert G. Dela Hunt, former member of the Wisconsin State Assembly
 John R. Devitt, former member of the Wisconsin State Assembly
 Mike Dhuey, co-inventor of the iPod, co-creator (with Ron Hochsprung) of the Macintosh II 
 John Gurda, Milwaukee historian and author
 Thomas J. Duffey, former member of the Wisconsin State Assembly
 Joseph "Red" Dunn, former member of the Green Bay Packers and inductee in the Wisconsin Athletic Hall of Fame
 James Fenelon, former member of the Wisconsin State Assembly
 Gary George, former member of the Wisconsin State Senate
 Scott Klement, computer scientist
 Bill Kraus, Co-Founder of Mission BBQ, former Dir. of Business Development for Under Armour
 Scott L. Klug, former U.S. Representative
 Michael Isaacson, Tony Award-winning Broadway & international producer
 Ira Madison III, television writer and podcaster
 Rick Majerus, former head men's basketball coach at Saint Louis University, Ball State & The University of Utah
 E. Michael McCann, former District Attorney of Milwaukee County, Wisconsin
 Alfred "Allie" McGuire, professional basketball player and son of Al McGuire
 Thomas W. Meaux, former member of the Wisconsin State Assembly
 John L. Merkt, member of the Wisconsin State Assembly
 Albert Gregory Meyer, Cardinal Archbishop of Chicago (1958–1965)
 Jake Moreland, former NFL player
 John E. Naus, dean of students and associate professor at Marquette University
 Phil Walzak, senior advisor to New York City Mayor Bill de Blasio
 Pat O'Brien, actor
 Edward J. O'Donnell, S.J., President of Marquette University (1948–1962)
 Dare Ogunbowale, NFL player with the Jacksonville Jaguars
 John E. Reilly Jr., member of the Wisconsin State Assembly and judge
 Richard M. Rice, member of the Wisconsin State Assembly and attorney
 Ervin J. Ryczek, member of the Wisconsin State Assembly and funeral director
 Dan Schutte, Catholic composer and author. Here I am, Lord, City of God, Sing a New Song
 John G. Schmitz, Republican congressman from California, and father of Mary Kay Letourneau.
 Harold V. Schoenecker, Wisconsin State Senator 1939-1943, Attorney
 John Sisk Jr., American football player
 Fred R. Sloan, U.S. Air National Guard Major General
 Midori Snyder, fantasy and science fiction writer, taught at MUHS
 Tom Snyder, radio and television personality
 Spencer Tracy, actor, nominated for Best Actor Oscar 9 times & winner twice
 James Tynion IV, comic book writer
 James Valcq, Broadway conductor & musical theater composer

See also
 List of Jesuit sites

References

External links 

Webster Club - Debate, Forensics, & Mock Trial
Hilltopper Robotics

Roman Catholic Archdiocese of Milwaukee
High schools in Milwaukee
Boys' schools in the United States
Jesuit high schools in the United States
Catholic secondary schools in Wisconsin
Greater Metro Conference
Educational institutions established in 1857
1857 establishments in Wisconsin